Bagnotar is a union council of Abbottabad District in Khyber-Pakhtunkhwa province of Pakistan. Bagnator is situated on the Abbottabad-Nathi Gali Road some 18 kilometers away from Abbottabad.

Location
Union council Bagnotar is situated in central part of District Abbottabad in Abbottabad Tehsil, and lies to south east of Abbottabad city – the capital city of the district. The area is included in the Lower Galliyat Belt. The main tribes of Bagnotar are the Sardars  (karlal) and Jadoons. However, other small groups like Awan, Pathan, Raja, Chohan (Nai), Abbasi and some Kashmiris are also settled in the area. Bagnotar is bounded by the following union councils, to the north by Sarbhana, and Beerangali, to the east Nagri Bala & Nathiagali, and to the south by Namli Maira and Phalkot, and to the west by Bagh.

Bagnotar town has an elevation of 1775 metres, and is located approximately 16 km from Abbottabad on Abbottabad-Murree Road.  A lush green pine valley stretched on 810 square kilometers. The major landscape as well as the settlement of Bagnotar is located along the Barrian-Nathigali-Abbottabad Road (Abbottabad Murree Road), the 11 kilometers of which passes through the land of Bagnotar.
The important places of Union Council Bagnotar are, Bagnotar, Bandi Maira, Thathi Chatarnath, Palakian and Chahan.

Subdivisions
Union Council Bagnotar has three subdivisions known as the "village councils". These four are:

Bag-Notar
Bandi Mera
Chhan

Educational Institutes in Bagnotar
Government Institutes of education in Bagnotar are as follows

Village Council Bagnotar

Government Boys Higher Secondary School Bagnotar

Government Girls High School Bagnotar

Government Primary School Bagnotar

Government Primary School Khurri Banda Bagnotar

Government Primary School Gulaga Bagnotar

Government Primary School Seri, Bagnotar

Government Primary School Gaiya Bagnotar

Village Council Bandi Maira
Government Primary School Riyan Tareeda

Government Girls Primary School Cham Rajput

Government Primary School Bandi Maira Nakrorha/Chatarnath/Maira.

Government Girls High School Drang Bandi Maira..

Village Council Chahan
Government Primary School Chahan, Bandi Maira

Vegetation
The vegetation in Bagnotar is naturally grown. Both coniferous and deciduous species are present on a large area of the whole union council. The notable species are Pinus wallichiana, Pinus roxburghii, Cedrus deodara, Taxus baccata, Diospyrus lotus, Salix tetrasperma, Quercus dilatata, Morus elba, Aesculus indica [5].

2005 earthquake

On 8 October 2005 various parts of Abbottabad District were affected by the Pakistan earthquake. Unlike neighbouring Kashmir, the loss in human life was relatively low in this area, with 511 dead and 622 injured.  Although the impact on infrastructure was still severe.

References

 

Union councils of Abbottabad District